Jennifer Beck (born August 3, 1974) is an American actress best known for playing a young Elizabeth on V: The Final Battle and V: The Series (episode 1).

The daughter of Jim and Lori Beck, she was born in Los Angeles, California, and began acting when she was 2 years old. She played Claire Carroll on the TV series Paradise.

She received three consecutive Young Artist Award nominations, 1989 to 1991, Best Young Actress Starring in a Television Series, for her role in Paradise. Her film debut occurred in  Tightrope (1984), and she also acted in The Canterville Ghost (1985) and Troll (1986).

Beck also made TV commercials for products that included Duncan Hines, Purolator Oil, and Trix.

In 1990, Beck received the American Youth Foundation Award for her community service. Her performance in Troll earned her a Youth in Film Award nomination for best supporting actress in a film, comedy, fantasy, or drama.

Filmography

Film

Television

References

External links
 
 

1974 births
Living people
American child actresses
American film actresses
American television actresses
Actresses from Los Angeles
20th-century American actresses
21st-century American women